Ernst Feuz (7 September 1909 – February 1988) was a Swiss ski jumper. He participated at the 1928 Winter Olympics in St. Moritz, where he placed eighth, with a first jump of 52.5 metres and a second jump of 58.5 metres. He initiated the Schilthorn Cableway in 1959.

References

External links
 
Short Biography 
Mention of Ernst Feuz's death (p. 14)

1909 births
1988 deaths
Swiss male ski jumpers
Olympic ski jumpers of Switzerland
Ski jumpers at the 1928 Winter Olympics